William White Hinchman (April 4, 1883 – February 20, 1963) was an American professional baseball outfielder. He played in Major League Baseball (MLB) from 1905 to 1920 for the Cincinnati Reds, Cleveland Naps, and Pittsburgh Pirates.

In 1916 he led the National League in triples with 16 as a member of the Pirates.

In 908 games over 10 seasons, Hinchman posted a .261 batting average (793-for-3043) with 364 runs, 69 triples, 20 home runs and 369 RBI.

See also
 List of Major League Baseball annual triples leaders

External links

1883 births
1963 deaths
Major League Baseball outfielders
Baseball players from Pennsylvania
Cincinnati Reds players
Cleveland Naps players
Pittsburgh Pirates players
Pittsburgh Pirates coaches
Pittsburgh Pirates scouts
Ilion Typewriters players
Columbus Senators players
Houston Buffaloes players
Jersey City Skeeters players